Post Mortem is a 2010 Chilean drama film directed by Pablo Larraín and set during the 1973 military coup that overthrew former President Salvador Allende, inaugurating the 17-year dictatorship of Augusto Pinochet. The film competed in the 67th Venice International Film Festival, Antofagasta Film Festival, Havana Film Festival and the Guadalajara International Film Festival. The film's main character Mario Cornejo is based on a real person with the same name.

Plot

Mario (Alfredo Castro) works as a pathologist's assistant in Santiago, responsible for taking down the pathologist's commentary during post-mortems. The job has given him a grey, deathly appearance. During the military coup, Mario had a love affair with a show dancer named Nancy (Antonia Zegers), who lives across the street with her younger brother David and her father, a communist and Allende supporter. On the morning of September 11, the date of the coup, a military raid takes place in Nancy's house and her brother and father are arrested. Mario embarks on a frantic search for Nancy, who has disappeared, while also facing pressure from the military to hide the true causes of death of the bodies piling up in the morgue.

Cinematography
The film has a projected aspect ratio of 2.66:1, which is ultra-wide and very unusual. One reviewer observes that "Post Mortem'''s muted color scheme reflects the drab '70s world that only adds insult to injury for Pinochet’s trampled victims." With director of photography Sergio Armstrong, Larraín shot the film with Russian LOMO anamorphic lenses, the type used in the 1970s by Andrei Tarkovsky and other Russian filmmakers. The lenses are intended for 35 mm film, but Larrain shot on 16 mm film, achieving a look he describes as "very special". Larraín describes the process of lighting the film as follows:
And then when we were shooting, we were doing all kinds of lighting setups, and we never liked anything that we had. One day we had an electrical problem and all the lighting we had set up went down before we started shooting. So I asked for somebody to turn on the lights for the room, and when I looked at the monitor I realized that I really liked the idea of using very regular light coming from the ceiling, but a lot of them. We created this very plain array so the film would have this public lighting look. It also made sense because there is a certain politic to it. And after the test we realized that it actually did work because it creates such muted colors with very little shadows and we liked that. It was plain, it was grainy, and the color palette was very special. So we only used regular lightbulbs, hung up all over the set but mostly from the ceiling.

Reception

The film is well-received by critics and considered further proof of Larraín’s talent, previously noted in Tony Manero. It received four stars from both The Guardian, which called it “an eerie portrait of a disturbing time” and Time Out, which praised the “humorously unconventional framings, expressively washed-out colour tones and mysterious low-key performances” that bring together “human comedy and historical tragedy to unique, and surprisingly emotional, effect.”. The New York Times critic A. O. Scott wrote that “the achievement of Post Mortem is to take rigorous and unsentimental measure of the unpleasantness”. Post Mortem has also been popular on the Rotten Tomatoes public film reviews website, where it has an 88% approval rating based on 34 reviews, with an average score of 7.08/10.

Cast

 Alfredo Castro - Mario Cornejo
 Antonia Zegers - Nancy Puelma (Bim Bam Bum dancer)
 Jaime Vadell - Dr. Castillo
 Amparo Noguera - Sandra
 Marcelo Alonso - Victor
 Marcial Tagle - Captain Montes
 Santiago Graffigna - David Puelma
 Ernesto Malbrán - Arturo Puelma
 Aldo Parodi - Director of Bim Bam Bum
 Adriano Castillo - comedian in Bim Bam Bum

Awards

 Antofagasta Film Festival - Best Film
 Antofagasta Film Festival - Best Actress (Antonia Zegers'')
 Havana Film Festival - Second Prize Coral
 Festival Internacional del Nuevo Cine Latinoamericano de La Habana - Best Actress (Antonia Zegers)
 Festival Internacional del Nuevo Cine Latinoamericano de La Habana - Best Actor (Alfredo Castro)
 Festival Internacional del Nuevo Cine Latinoamericano de La Habana - Best Screenplay
 Festival Internacional del Nuevo Cine Latinoamericano de La Habana - FIPRESCI Award
 Festival Internacional de Cine de Cartagena - Best Picture
 Festival Internacional de Cine de Guadalajara - Best Picture
 Festival Internacional de Cine de Guadalajara - Best Actor (Alfredo Castro)
 Festival Internacional de Cine de Guadalajara - Best Cinematography (Sergio Armstrong)

See also 
 Cinema of Chile

References

External links

 (archived / 2010)

Cineuropa

2010 films
2010 drama films
Films about the Chilean military dictatorship
Films set in 1973
2010s Spanish-language films
Films directed by Pablo Larraín
Chilean drama films
Films about coups d'état
2010s Chilean films
2010s Mexican films